Jan Kanty Moszyński (c. 1690 – 14 September 1737) was a Polish-Lithuanian nobleman and politician, Treasurer of the Crown Court from 1729. He came from a poor noble family but married the daughter of Augustus II the Strong. His grandfather was Andrzej Ludwik Moszyński (died 1683). His father, Aleksander Michał, lived in a small village in Podlasie and served as its treasurer. He was awarded the Order of White Eagle on 18 February 1730.  Moszyński and more so his son Frederyk August Moszyński (1739–1786) built a notable museum collection.

References

Bibliography
Julian Bartoszewicz: Znakomici mężowie Polscy w XVIII w. Vol. 2, Petersburg 1856, pp. 117–198

17th-century Polish nobility
18th-century Polish–Lithuanian politicians
18th-century Polish nobility
1737 deaths
Year of birth uncertain
Recipients of the Order of the White Eagle (Poland)